Thomas Hampson (1839 – 25 November 1918) was an English author and local historian.

Life
He was born in Horwich in 1839, the youngest child of Henry and Mary Hampson. He was baptised at Holy Trinity Church, Horwich on 10 November 1839. His father died in May 1842, leaving his mother to bring up the children on her own. He started work at Wallsuches bleach works in Horwich when he was seven-years-old. He married Sarah Jane Aldred at Holy Trinity Church, Horwich on 2 April 1866. They had three sons: John Henry, John Fox, and Benjamin, and three daughters: Clara, Mary Ann, and Eleanor. After his marriage, he continued to be employed at the bleach works as a finisher, but between 1877 and 1881 he lost a number of fingers on his left hand in a works accident which seems to have forced him into a clerical career. He was a secretary at the short-lived Red Moss Ironworks, Horwich. Then employed as a cashier, first at Scot Lane Colliery, Blackrod, then at Fourgates Colliery, Wingates, Westhoughton.

It was around this period of his life he wrote a number of notable local history books. He published History of Blackrod in 1882, Horwich: Its History, Legends, and Church in 1883, and History of Rivington in 1893.

After Horwich Works were built by the Lancashire and Yorkshire Railway (L&YR) in 1886, he was employed as a labourer in the iron foundry, then as a locomotive stores keeper.

His wife, Sarah Jane, died in April 1907, aged 64, and eleven years later Thomas died at Bolton Royal Infirmary on 25 November 1918, aged 79. They are both buried in Holy Trinity Churchyard, Horwich.

Notes

References

Bibliography

External links
 Horwich: Its History, Legends, and Church (archive.org)
 History of Rivington (archive.org)

1839 births
1918 deaths
People from Horwich
English local historians